Caladenia georgei, commonly known as the tuart spider orchid, is a species of orchid endemic to the south-west of Western Australia. It has a single, hairy leaf and up to three whitish to yellowish-green flowers flushed with red and which have a white labellum with a red tip.

Description
The flowers are whitish to yellowish-green, flushed with red while the lateral sepals have narrow, club-like, glandular tips. The lateral sepals and petals spread widely and curve downwards. Flowering occurs in September and October.

Taxonomy and naming
Caladenia georgei was first described in 2001 by Stephen Hopper and Andrew Phillip Brown from a specimen collected near Bunbury and the description was published in Nuytsia. The specific epithet (georgei) honours Alex George.

Distribution and habitat
Tuart spider orchid occurs between Yanchep and Busselton in the Jarrah Forest and Swan Coastal Plain biogeographic regions where it grows in deep sandy soil in woodland, especially tuart woodland.

Conservation
Caladenia georgei  is classified as "not threatened" by the Government of Western Australia Department of Parks and Wildlife.

References

georgei
Orchids of Western Australia
Endemic orchids of Australia
Plants described in 2001
Endemic flora of Western Australia
Taxa named by Stephen Hopper
Taxa named by Andrew Phillip Brown